Mohammadabad (also Romanized as Moḩammadābād) is a village in Bandan Rural District, in the Central District of Nehbandan County, South Khorasan Province, Iran. At the 2006 census, its population was 19, in 4 families.

References 

Populated places in Nehbandan County